Jorginho James (born 7 July 1994) is a Jamaican international footballer who plays for Harbour View, as a midfielder.

Career

Club
James has played schoolboy football for Kingston College. He also featured for RSPL club Harbour View. He had a short loan spells with Perak FA in the Malaysia Super League, but returned without making an appearance for the club. Jorginho has trialed and trained at USA (Reading United FC, USL PDL), Japan (Shimizu S-Pulse, J-League), and Antigua, (Grenades FC).

He was loaned out again in March 2016 to United Soccer League side Rio Grande Valley FC Toros.

International
He made his senior international debut for Jamaica on 22 February 2012; James, 17 at the time, came on as an 82nd-minute substitute in the friendly match against Cuba, scoring five minutes later.

James also made his U20 debut in the 2013 CONCACAF U-20 Championship against Antigua and Barbuda on 7 November 2013.

International goals

References

1994 births
Living people
Jamaican footballers
Jamaica international footballers
Rio Grande Valley FC Toros players
USL Championship players
Association football midfielders
National Premier League players
Harbour View F.C. players
Perak F.C. players
Jamaican expatriate footballers
Jamaican expatriates in Malaysia
Expatriate footballers in Malaysia
Jamaican expatriates in the United States
Expatriate soccer players in the United States